Janet Daley (born 21 March 1944) is an American-born conservative journalist living and working in Britain. She is currently a columnist for The Sunday Telegraph.

Life and career

Daley studied philosophy at the University of California at Berkeley, after which, in 1965, she moved to England, where she received an MPhil in philosophy at the University of London. She then taught philosophy at the Open University, the University of London and the Royal College of Art. Daley left academia in 1987 to become a full time journalist. She first wrote for The Times, The Sunday Times, The Independent and The Spectator. In 1989, she became a columnist for The Independent, followed in 1990 by The Times, before moving to The Sunday Telegraph in 1996.

During the 1960s, while still a student, Daley identified as a Marxist. During the 1980s, she was a member of Hornsey Labour Party.

While still teaching philosophy, she developed an interest in the philosophy of design and in 1982 published Design Creativity and Understanding Design Objectives for Design Studies (Vol. 3, No 3), where she suggested that, as part of the creative process, individual designers bring a set of schemata to their design creation, including visual, verbal and value systems. She contributed to what later became recognised as an influential conference on design methods held at Portsmouth Polytechnic School of Architecture in 1967, which led to the book Design Methods in Architecture (1969), edited by Geoffrey Broadbent and Anthony Ward. Her contribution, titled "A philosophical critique of behaviourism in architectural design", was an early critique of the then much favoured architecture theorist Christopher Alexander.

Conservative ideology

In a 2003 article titled "Up from Liberalism", she relates how her political views shifted notably from a leftist to a conservative viewpoint based on her early years in the UK. Of great significance in her ideological shift was the class structure in the UK, something she had not previously encountered in her homeland, and exemplified she believed by a working class with few aspirations. She noted, for instance, that "the left-wing elite castigated teachers for attempting to correct the working-class accents and dialects that help trap children in the limitations of their own backgrounds."

Daley was a vocal opponent of legislative changes in the UK during the 1990s that would have equalised the age of consent for homosexuals to that of heterosexuals. Writing in The Times, she described gay life as "aggressive freemasonry", and argued that homosexuality led to "childlessness, instability and mortal danger from Aids.”

Daley expressed support of the Leave campaign in the 2016 United Kingdom referendum on Membership of the European Union.

She was a vocal supporter of the Conservative Party in the 2019 United Kingdom General Election.  
Daley has been married since 1967 and has two daughters.

Bibliography

References

1944 births
British journalists
The Daily Telegraph people
Living people
Writers from Boston